Helena Ndaipovanhu Ndume is a Namibian ophthalmologist, notable for her charitable work among sufferers of eye-related illnesses in Namibia. To date, Ndume has ensured that some 30,000 blind Namibians have received eye surgery and are fitted with intra-ocular lens implants free of charge. She organizes a minimum of 5 eye camps annually, which benefit an estimated 1,000 persons ranging in age from 4 years to 90+. Ndume is currently the head of the ophthalmology department at Windhoek Central Hospital, Namibia's largest hospital, and is one of only six Namibian ophthalmologists. She was listed as one of BBC's 100 women during 2018.Her biggest goal in life is to end preventable blindness and to build a team of committed young people to carry on with the mission even when she is not here. For over 20 years, Ndume has worked as a volunteer ophthalmologist for SEE International.  Ndume’s motivation to serve those less fortunate than her stems from the civil unrest that she witnessed as a child. Forced to flee her homeland at the age of 15 because of the apartheid, she lived in SWAPO refugee camps in Angola and Zambia. With SWAPO’s assistance, she completed secondary school in the Gambia and earned a medical degree in Germany.

Early life and education
Helena Ndume was born in Tsumeb, Oshikoto Region. She studied life medicine in Germany, before returning to Namibia in 1989 to complete a medical internship. She later returned to Germany, to specialise in ophthalmology at the University of Leipzig.

She is married, and has one son.

Work in Namibia
In 1995, Ndume was introduced to Surgical Eye Expeditions International, and set about starting a project in Namibia. In August 1997, the first eye camp was held at Rundu, Kavango Region. Currently, four or five eye camps are held each year in different locations.

Work with the Namibia Red Cross Society
For six years, from 2001 to 2007, Ndume was vice chairperson of the Namibia Red Cross Society. In 2009, she was honoured with a humanitarian award by the NRCS for her work in restoring sight to those blinded by cataracts.

Work with SEE International
Ndume has volunteered with sight-restoring nonprofit SEE International since 1995. Since then, SEE International and  Ndume have collaborated to hold free week-long eye clinics in Namibia, typically twice every year. These clinics provide free eye surgeries for approximately 300 impoverished men, women, and children.

International Recognition and Awards
 Lions Club International Humanitarian Award (2022)
 The Forbes Woman Africa Social Impact Award (2022)
 Helena Ndume and Jorge Fernando Branco Sampaio of Portugal became the first recipients of the United Nations Nelson Mandela Prize on 22 June 2015.
 Grand Commander of the Order of Namibia First Class;
 Red Cross International Humanitarian Service Award (2009);
 Rotary International Humanitarian Award in the fight against blindness (2008);
 Namibia National Science Award (2005);
 Humanitarian award in the prevention of blindness in Santa Barbara, California, USA (2001);
 Lions International Award in recognition of sincere and devoted efforts with Lions Operation Brightsight Project (1999).

Interests 
Dr Ndume has dedicated her life and career to treating blindness and low vision, both in Namibia and throughout the developing world. She is more on helping out people who are suffering not only by sight but financially too.

References

Year of birth missing (living people)
Living people
People from Tsumeb
Namibian ophthalmologists
Leipzig University alumni
BBC 100 Women